Nuga Nuga is a national park in Queensland, Australia, 515 km NW of Brisbane. It lies adjacent to Lake Nuga Nuga in the Comet River water catchment area of the Brigalow Belt bioregion.

It contains small areas of lacustrine and riverine wetlands.

One rare of threatened reptile species, Denisonia maculata, has been identified in the national park.

See also

 Protected areas of Queensland

References

National parks of Central Queensland
Protected areas established in 1993
1993 establishments in Australia